{{Infobox government agency
| agency_name     = Ministry of the Environment
| type            = 
| nativename      = Miljödepartementet
| logo            = 
| logo_width      = 
| logo_caption    = 
| seal            = 
| seal_width      = 
| seal_caption    = 
| picture         = 
| picture_width   = 
| picture_caption = 
| formed          = 
| preceding1      = 
| preceding2      = 
| dissolved       = 2022
| superseding     = 
| jurisdiction    = 
| headquarters    = Fredsgatan 6, Stockholm
| coordinates     = 
| employees       = 
| budget          = 
| minister1_name  = 
| minister1_pfo   = | minister2_name  = 
| minister2_pfo   = 
| chief1_name     = 
| chief1_position = 
| chief2_name     = 
| chief2_position = 
| agency_type     = 
| parent_agency   = 
| child1_agency   = 
| child2_agency   = 
| keydocument1    = 
| website         = 
| footnotes       = 
| map             = 
| map_width       = 
| map_caption     = 
}}

The Ministry of the Environment''' was a government ministry in Sweden responsible for the government's environmental policies regarding chemicals, natural environment and biological diversity. It was dissolved in 2022 by the government of Ulf Kristersson, with environmental issues being relocated to the Ministry of Enterprise and Innovation.

The ministry offices were located on Fredsgatan 6 in Stockholm.

History 
Previously environmental issues had been handled by the Ministry of Agriculture and energy issues had been handled by the Ministry of Industry.

The cabinet of Fredrik Reinfeldt — which took office on October 6, 2006 — used the short form name again, transferred energy issues to the Ministry of Enterprise, Energy and Communications, and housing issues were transferred to the Ministry of Finance. In 2014, the ministry reverted to its original name under the cabinet of Stefan Löfven.

Following the election of the government of Ulf Kristersson in October 2022, environmental issues were delegated to the Ministry of Enterprise and Innovation, led by the Minister for Energy and Enterprise, Ebba Busch.

Areas of responsibility 

The ministry's areas of responsibility were:

 Chemicals policy
 Climate policy
 Ecocycle policy
 Environmental legislation and quality objectives
 Nature conservation and biological diversity
 Sustainable Development
 Water and seas

Organization 

The ministry was headed by the Minister for Climate and the Environment, Romina PourmokhtariMinister for Climate and the Environment and the Deputy Prime Minister of Sweden , currently Ebba Busch, who are appointed by the Prime Minister. Below ministerial level, operations are directed by a State Secretary. The ministry also has a press secretary and political advisers, who work closely with the minister on policy issues.

The Ministry was divided by nine divisions and the ministry leadership.

 Division for Climate
 Division for Natural Environment
 Division for Chemicals
 Division for Environmental Assessment
 Division for Environmental Objectives
 Division for Coordination and Support
 Division for Legal Services
 Division for International Affairs
 Division for Communication

Government agencies 
The Ministry of the Environment and Energy was principal to the following government agencies:

See also
List of Swedish environment ministers

References

External links
 

Sweden
Energy in Sweden
Sweden
Environment
Sweden, Environment
Ministries disestablished in 2022